House at 58 Eighteenth Avenue is a historic home located at Sea Cliff in Nassau County, New York.  It was built in 1893 and is a two-story, three bay clapboard sided residence with a cross gable roof in the Late Victorian style.  It features a first floor porch with spindle balustrade and fishscale shingling.  Also on the property is a contributing cast iron fence.

It was listed on the National Register of Historic Places in 1988.

References

Houses on the National Register of Historic Places in New York (state)
Victorian architecture in New York (state)
Houses completed in 1893
Houses in Nassau County, New York
National Register of Historic Places in Nassau County, New York